Leslie Green (17 October 1941 – 30 July 2012) was an English footballer and manager.

Playing career

Atherstone Town
Les Green started out at a young age playing for youth teams around his hometown of Atherstone. He played for Atherstone Boys Club, Mancetter and Baddesley Colliery before being snapped up by local team Atherstone Town.

Green then decided to try to make it with a professional team, so he managed to get a trial with Arsenal.

Hull City
Following this Hull City came calling for Green's services and he signed for The Tigers in 1960. Following 4 appearances Green returned to Non-League football with Nuneaton Borough.

Burton Albion
After three years with Boro, Green joined Burton Albion under the management of Peter Taylor.

Hartlepool United
After just three months with the Brewers, Green followed Taylor to Hartlepool United where he made 34 appearances over the course of two seasons.

Rochdale
1967 saw Green on the move again, this time playing for Rochdale under Bob Stokoe

Derby County
Green was at The Dale for just over one season and made 44 appearances before for the third time in his career he was reunited with Peter Taylor but this time at Derby County in 1968.

The season Green joined a team that was changing for the better under Clough and Taylor's management. He was part of Football League Second Division winning team and the side that was in constant dispute with Leeds United due to the Clough/Revie rivalry.

Durban City
In 1971 Green decided to leave top flight English football for National Football League side Durban City in South Africa. During his time with the Golden Boys, Green played with the likes of Alan Skirton, Bernd Patzke and Johnny Byrne. Green also had the pleasure of playing alongside Stanley Matthews in a rare guest appearance – when the man himself was into his fifties.

Sadly Green's leg was badly broken in a clash with Bobby Viljoen in a crunch derby game against arch-rivals Durban United which ended his playing career.

Green's last game was a testimonial match for former Derby County goalkeeper Martin Taylor in a game against Everton on 14 May 1997. The game ended 4–1 to The Rams.

Management career
Following Green's retirement from football – he stayed in South Africa at Durban City as assistant manager until returning to England to take on the role of Commercial Manager at former side Nuneaton Borough.

Green went on to become manager of Nuneaton Borough. He then went on to manage a string of Non-League clubs Hinckley Town, Tamworth and Bedford.

Personal life
Green was married to Heidi, the daughter of a Natal farmer, whom he met whilst residing in South Africa.
Green had a son called Simon.

Death
On 30 June 2012, Green died of cancer at Loros Hospice near Leicester, aged 70. After the news of his death, former teammates from the world of football paid tribute to him. John McGovern, who played with Green at both Hartlepool and Derby County said, "I went to see him a few days ago and he was in a poor way but I'm glad I went, because we managed to have a last couple of laughs together. He was an incredible character."

Career honours

Honours as player

Derby County
 Football League Second Division: 1968-69

Durban City
 Champion of Champions: 1971
 National Football League: 1972
 Coca-Cola Shield: 1972

Managerial stats

References

1941 births
2012 deaths
People from Atherstone
Association football goalkeepers
English footballers
Atherstone Town F.C. players
Hull City A.F.C. players
Nuneaton Borough F.C. players
Burton Albion F.C. players
Hartlepool United F.C. players
Rochdale A.F.C. players
Derby County F.C. players
Tamworth F.C. players
Durban City F.C. players
English Football League players
English football managers
Nuneaton Borough F.C. managers
Tamworth F.C. managers